Glisnica may refer to:

Glisnica, Montenegro
Gliśnica, Greater Poland Voivodeship, Poland
Gliśnica, Pomeranian Voivodeship, Poland